Biojoule Thermal Power Station is a   biogas-fired thermal power station in Kenya, the largest economy in East African Community.

Location
The approximate coordinates of the power plant are:0°41'37.0"S, 36°25'55.0"E (Latitude:-0.693611; Longitude:36.431944).

Overview
The power station, which is expected to come online in March 2015, has a generating capacity of 2.4 Megawatts. Construction was completed in January 2015. Biojoule Kenya Limited, the company that owns he power station, signed a 20-year power purchasing agreement with Kenya Power and Lighting Company, to supply 2MW to the national electricity grid. Once operational, the power station will be the first biogas-fired power plant to sell power to the national grid. Power is generated using plant waste generated on the  Gorge Farm, near Lake Naivasha, owned by VP Group, an investor in the power project. The plant material is allowed to decompose anaerobically, generating gases, including methane. The gases are burnt, generating heat, which is used to heat water, generating steam. The steam is then used to run electricity generators. Some of the heat is used to warm greenhouses on the arm. The power generated will be evacuated via a substation within nearby Naivasha Town.

Developers and financing
Biojoule Power Station was constructed at a cost of KSh591 million (US$6.5 million). The power station is 50% owned by the family that owns VP Group. The remaining 50% is owned by unnamed investors from the United Kingdom. CfC Stanbic Bank provided a loan of US$3.25 million, while the owners raised the remaining US$3.25. The power remaining over after sale to Kenya Power will be sold to the VP Group and some will be used internally by the power station.

Other considerations
In addition to producing electricity and heat, the plant will produce an estimated 35,000 tonnes of fertilizer annually, from the remnants of anaerobic digestion. In addition to the plant material generated at Gorge Farm Energy Park, more raw material will be sourced from the neighboring Van den Berg Roses Farm.

See also
Kenya Power Stations
Africa Power Stations
World Power Stations

References

External links
 Website of Biojoule Kenya Limited

Biofuel power stations in Kenya
Nakuru County
Central Province (Kenya)